HMCS Norsyd was a modified  that served with the Royal Canadian Navy during the Second World War. She served primarily in the Battle of the Atlantic as a convoy escort. She was named for North Sydney, Nova Scotia, her name being a contraction of the city's name. This was due to a naming conflict with a Royal Australian Navy vessel. After the war she served as a merchant ship and then as a corvette in the Israeli Navy.

Background

Flower-class corvettes like Norsyd serving with the Royal Canadian Navy during the Second World War were different from earlier and more traditional sail-driven corvettes. The "corvette" designation was created by the French as a class of small warships; the Royal Navy borrowed the term for a period but discontinued its use in 1877. During the hurried preparations for war in the late 1930s, Winston Churchill reactivated the corvette class, needing a name for smaller ships used in an escort capacity, in this case based on a whaling ship design. The generic name "flower" was used to designate the class of these ships, which – in the Royal Navy – were named after flowering plants.

Corvettes commissioned by the Royal Canadian Navy during the Second World War were named after communities for the most part, to better represent the people who took part in building them. This idea was put forth by Admiral Percy W. Nelles. Sponsors were commonly associated with the community for which the ship was named. Royal Navy corvettes were designed as open sea escorts, while Canadian corvettes were developed for coastal auxiliary roles which was exemplified by their minesweeping gear. Eventually the Canadian corvettes would be modified to allow them to perform better on the open seas.

Construction
Norsyd was ordered 2 January 1942 as part of the 1942-43 modified Flower-class building programme. This programme was known as the Increased Endurance. Many changes were made, all from lessons that had been learned in previous versions of the Flower-class. The bridge was made a full deck higher and built to naval standards instead of the more civilian-like bridges of previous versions. The platform for the 4-inch main gun was raised to minimize the amount of spray over it and to provide a better field of fire. It was also connected to the wheelhouse by a wide platform that was now the base for the Hedgehog anti-submarine mortar that this version was armed with. Along with the new Hedgehog, this version got the new QF 4-inch Mk XIX main gun, which was semi-automatic, used fixed ammunition and had the ability to elevate higher giving it an anti-aircraft ability.

Other superficial changes to this version include an upright funnel and pressurized boiler rooms which eliminated the need for hooded ventilators around the base of the funnel. This changed the silhouette of the corvette and made it more difficult for submariners to tell which way the corvette was laying.

Norsyd was laid down by Morton Engineering and Dry Dock Co. at Quebec City, Quebec 14 January 1943 and was launched 31 July 1943. She was commissioned into the Royal Canadian Navy 22 December 1943 at Quebec City. She was diverted to Saint John, New Brunswick en route to Halifax for fitting out. This was not completed until March 1944. In May 1945, Norsyd began the only refit of her war career at Halifax. It was completed in June 1945.

Service history
After working up in Bermuda, Norsyd was assigned to the Western Local Escort Force working as an escort on the "Triangle Run" between Boston, New York and Halifax. She joined escort group W-7 until November 1944. While escorting a convoy on 8 September 1944 she spotted U-541 preparing to attack the convoy while on the surface in the Gulf of St. Lawrence. Norsyd opened fire and U-541 was forced to dive. The u-boat was then hunted for two days by four frigates, a minesweeper and aircraft of the Royal Canadian Air Force, but escaped.

She transferred to the Mid-Ocean Escort Force that month, becoming a trans-Atlantic convoy escort. She was assigned to escort group C-2 and remained with the group until departing for refit in May 1945. She never returned to active service.

Norsyd was paid off 25 June 1945 at Sorel, Quebec and laid up. She was transferred to the War Assets Corporation and sold for mercantile conversion. In 1946 she emerged as Balboa which was used to smuggle Jewish immigrants into British-held Palestine as part of the Aliyah Bet movement. She remained there until being taken over by the Israeli Navy.

Israeli Naval Service
In 1948 she was taken over and rearmed by the nascent Israeli Navy and renamed Haganah. During her service with the Israeli Navy, she fought in the 1948 Arab–Israeli War. During Operation Yoav, she, alongside INS Wedgwood, another corvette, engaged Egyptian naval forces and shore batteries. They did little damage and suffered enough damage that they had to be sent back to Haifa for repairs. She was paid off and broken up in 1956.

Notes

References

 
 

1943 ships
Flower-class corvettes of the Royal Canadian Navy
Corvettes of the Israeli Navy